Rathwali(rāṭhavālī) or Rathi is spoken in the Pauri district of Uttarakhand state. Currently it has been classified as a dialect under Garhwhali, belonging to the Central Pahari group(as per Grierson) which itself has been classified as a dialect of Hindi. It is also known as Rathi(rāṭhī). It comes under the Indo Aryan family.

Grammar

Gender :

Rules for gender are same as Srinagaria.

Number :

Tadbhava masc. nouns which end with a in Hindi, in Rathwali end with o. However some exceptions exist.

Cases :

Adjectives :

Follows same rules as Srinagaria, however the final a is changed into a.

Pronouns :

Reflexive Pronoun is aaphu

Conjugation :

Auxiliary Verbs & Verbs Substantive

Comparative analysis

Script & specimen

References 

Northern Indo-Aryan languages
Languages of Uttarakhand